The Farmer & Settler, later published as The Farmer & Settler and Livestock Breeders Journal, was an English-language broadsheet newspaper published in Sydney, Australia between 1906 and 1957. It was primarily published weekly.

History
The first issue was published on 7 February 1906 and the paper remained in publication until 27 December 1957. The paper was initially sub-titled "The Official Newspaper of the Farmers and Settlers Association of New South Wales", but as the years progressed the paper acquired several different subtitles, including, for a period, "The Voice of the Rural World". The first editor of the newspaper was Charles White, whose son Percy was the founder of the newspaper.

In August 1911 the paper began to be published twice weekly, and this continued until shortly after the beginning of World War 1. From Monday 7 September 1914, the paper was published daily to report on "the war from day to day".

Digitisation
The paper has been digitised as part of the Australian Newspapers Digitisation Program of the National Library of Australia.

See also
 List of newspapers in New South Wales
 List of newspapers in Australia
 List of defunct newspapers of Australia

References

External links
 

Defunct newspapers published in Sydney
Newspapers on Trove